Sandhills Global is a privately held American information processing company that produces a diverse range of products and services from well-established trade publications and websites to hosted technology services. The company primarily serves the transportation, agriculture, aircraft, heavy machinery, and technology industries. Its trade publications include TractorHouse, Machinery Trader, Machinery Trader Auction Results, Truck Paper, RentalYard, and AuctionTime,   in addition to Controller, Executive Controller, and Charter Hub. Each print publication also has a companion website. Sandhills' portfolio also includes software and online services such as www.AuctionTime.com, BidCaller, Auction Flex, HiBid, Aircraft Cost Calculator, FleetEvaluator, Fast Track Iron, CraneTrader, EquipmentFacts, RV Universe, MotorSports Universe, Power Systems Today, Oil Field Trader, The Gage Team and others.

History 
The company was first established by Tom and Rhonda Peed as Peed Corp. in 1978 in Webster City, Iowa.  In 1985, the headquarters were relocated to a  campus in the Highlands neighborhood of Lincoln, Nebraska, where they remain.  In June 2000, Sandhills added a data center in Scottsdale, Arizona.  In 2011, the company completed another data center on its Lincoln, Nebraska campus, a LEED gold-rated building that houses the company's server farm and has three living roofs.

The Lincoln campus expanded in 2015 with an additional IT facility. In the same year, Sandhills worked with Goss International, a company that supplies presses and finishing systems, to install a new press and saddlesticher to expand its printing operations. In 2017, Sandhills announced the construction of an additional 42,000-square-foot facility and also opened an additional office location in Sidney, Nebraska. In December 2017, Sandhills opened another new building, its sixth in Lincoln since 1985. The new 42,000-square-foot Cyber Center houses 240 employee workstations, a reception area and cafe space, as well as classrooms and other training facilities.

International subsidiaries and brands 
Sandhills Global has two international subsidiaries, Sandhills East and Sandhills Pacific. Sandhills East has office locations in Manchester, UK; Peterborough, UK; Essex, UK; Senningerberg, Luxembourg; Madrid, Spain; Nereto, Italy; Milan, Italy; and Beaucamps Le Vieux, France. Sandhills Pacific is based out of Brisbane, Australia with an office in Sydney. Sandhills' international brands include Farm & Plant Buyers Guide, Farm Machinery Locator, Truck Locator, Plant Locator, Van Locator, Commercial Vehicle Dealer, Focus People Solutions, CamionSuperMarket, TrattoriSuperMarket, Cantierissimo con Carrellistica, Transporto Commerciale, A come Agricoltura, CercoCamion, Maquinaria OP, Todo VI, Moma Agri, Moma Farm, Resale Weekly, tp-Business, trucks-Business, agri-Business, compact-Business</ref>, Resale Weekly, Truck Buy & Sell International, Transporter, and TruckWorld.com.au.

References

External links
 Sandhills Global

Magazine publishing companies of the United States
Computer magazine publishing companies
Companies based in Lincoln, Nebraska
Online companies of the United States
Publishing companies established in 1978